The Floridians Football Club (Floridians FC or FFC) is an American soccer team based in Fort Lauderdale, Florida, United States.  The club currently competes in the fourth tier of the American soccer pyramid, a hierarchy football soccer structure model. The Floridians compete in the Premier Development League (PDL). in the Southeast Division of the Southern Conference. The football club plays its home games on the Main Event Field at Central Broward Regional Park in nearby Lauderhill, Florida. The club's colors are navy and yellow, with a yellow soccer ball logo badge.

History

On Wednesday, May 20, 2009, Schulz Academy was announced as a USL Premier Development League expansion franchise, joining the league in 2010. The team played its first competitive game on May 7, 2010, a 1–0 loss to the Bradenton Academics.

At the time, USL's Executive Vice President and COO, Tim Holt was “thrilled to welcome such a successful youth program as the Schulz Academy to the PDL". Their proven track record in developing players, including US National Team star Jozy Altidore, speaks for itself. "The club is a model organization in the Super Y-League and we are confident they will be an asset to the Southeast Division of the PDL.

The PDL team was coached by founder Dr. Josef Schulz, recognized as one of the top youth coaches in the country.  Notable players that have been developed within the club included Matt Luzunaris, Hasani Sinclair and CJ Phelps of the U18 US Men's National Team; Donovan Henry, Zach Herold, and Stefan Jerome of the US U17 Men's National Team; and US National Team and Toronto FC striker Jozy Altidore.  Academy founder Josef Schulz died of cancer on July 22, 2013.  With the sad passing of its founder, Schulz Academy decided to resume the Soccer Academy but gave up the PDL franchise to the Floridians FC.

The Floridians F.C. want to bring talents to South Florida and establish strong partnerships with professional players and clubs around the world.  They will be competing in the PDL league of the USL and have established their home base at the Central Broward Park Stadium.  The stadium,  located at the heart of the Tri County Area offers easy access from the whole Miami Metropolitan Area, has a capacity of 15,000 seats and has the capabilities to welcome the tournaments and the many events the club will be hosting.

Players

Current players

Notable former players
This list of notable former players comprises players who went on to play professional soccer after playing for the team in the Premier Development League, or those who previously played professionally before joining the team with Schulz Academy.
  Jozy Altidore
  Matt Luzunaris
  Shawn Barry
  Darnell King
  Moussa Toure

Former players

Year-by-year

Head coaches
  Fernando Valenzuela (2014–Current)
  Claude Anelka (2013–2014)
  Josef Schulz (2010–2013)

Stadium
 Main Event Field at Central Broward Regional Park; Lauderhill, Florida (2010–present)
 Stadium at Florida Atlantic University; Boca Raton, Florida 1 game (2010)

References

External links
 Official Site

USL League Two teams
Soccer clubs in Miami
Soccer clubs in Florida
Soccer clubs in South Florida